The Ministry of Environment and Physical Planning of the Republic of North Macedonia (MoEPP) is a governmental executive authority with its head office on the 10th, 11th, and 12th floors of the MRTV building in Skopje. It was created for the purpose of protecting human health and the environment by writing and enforcing regulations based on laws passed by the Macedonian Parliament and European Parliament

References

External links

 Ministry of Environment and Physical Planning
 Ministry of Environment and Physical Planning 

Government of North Macedonia